A parkway railway station is a railway station that primarily serves a park and ride interchange rather than a town or city centre. The name parkway originally referred to  being built next to the M32 motorway, which was built through parkland and thus known as the "Bristol Parkway". The term has come to mean equally a park and ride bus and/or other motor car interchange with the UK light, regular or international railway network. One example refers to such an interchange with the tram network.

East and West Midlands 
 Alfreton railway station (formerly Alfreton and Mansfield Parkway)
 Birmingham International railway station
 Coleshill Parkway railway station
 East Midlands Parkway railway station
 Stratford-upon-Avon Parkway railway station
 Sutton Parkway railway station (named after Sutton-in-Ashfield)
 Tame Bridge Parkway railway station
 Warwick Parkway railway station
 Wednesbury Parkway tram stop
 Worcestershire Parkway railway station

South, South East and East 
 Aylesbury Vale Parkway railway station
 Cambridge North railway station
 Didcot Parkway railway station
 Ebbsfleet International railway station
 Haddenham & Thame Parkway railway station
 Luton Airport Parkway railway station
 Oxford Parkway railway station
 Southampton Airport Parkway railway station
 Swanley Parkway railway station (served by the Swanley New Barn Railway, a narrow gauge line taking passengers into Swanley Park)
 Whittlesford Parkway railway station (serving equally Duxford)

North-East and Yorkshire 
 Apperley Bridge railway station
 Callerton Parkway Metro station (Tyne & Wear Metro)
 New Pudsey railway station

North-West
 Buckshaw Parkway railway station
 Horwich Parkway railway station
 Liverpool South Parkway railway station

Scotland
 Edinburgh Park railway station
 Newcraighall railway station

South-West 
 Bodmin Parkway railway station
 Bristol Parkway railway station
 Lelant Saltings railway station (park-and-ride for St Ives)
 Tiverton Parkway railway station

Wales
 Ebbw Vale Parkway railway station
 Port Talbot Parkway railway station

Proposals and withdrawn proposals 
 Gloucestershire Parkway railway station
 Portway Parkway railway station
 Roseberry Parkway railway station
 Rushden Parkway railway station
 Thanet Parkway railway station
 West Wales Parkway railway station
 Cardiff Parkway railway station

See also 
 Parkway
 Connecting Communities: Expanding Access to the Rail Network, a 2009 report from the Association of Train Operating Companies detailing seven new commercially viable parkway station locations in England

References 

Parkway railway stations
Parkway railway stations in Britain